James Henry Gorbey (July 30, 1920 – October 24, 1977) was an American politician and judge from Pennsylvania. He was a Republican member of the Chester City Council from 1956 to 1963 and served as mayor of Chester, Pennsylvania from 1964 to 1967 during the Chester school protests. Gorbey was a judge of the Delaware County Court of Common Pleas from 1968 to 1970 and a United States district judge of the United States District Court for the Eastern District of Pennsylvania from 1970 to 1977.

Early life and education
Gorbey was born in Chester, Pennsylvania and served as a lieutenant in the United States Marine Corps during World War II from 1942 to 1945. He received a Bachelor of Arts degree from Bowling Green State University in 1945 and a Bachelor of Laws from Temple University Beasley School of Law in 1949.

Career
Gorbey was in private practice in Chester from 1949 to 1967. He also served as an investigator and appraiser for the Commonwealth of Pennsylvania Inheritance Tax Department in 1950. He was an editor of the Delaware County Legal Journal from 1951 to 1952. Gorbey served as a member of the Chester City Council from 1956 to 1963, and as mayor of Chester from 1964 to 1967. As Gorbey assumed the position of mayor, the Chester school protests were roiling the city with major racial strife and civil rights protests led by George Raymond of the Chester branch of the NAACP and Stanley Branche of the Committee for Freedom Now (CFFN). During his inauguration speech, Gorbey stated, "Chester has no Negro problem... and demonstrations will no longer be tolerated."

In the spring of 1964, a series of almost nightly protests brought chaos to Chester and resulted in mass arrests of protesters.  As mayor, Gorbey issued "The Police Position to Preserve the Public Peace", a ten-point statement promising an immediate return to law and order.  The city deputized firemen and trash collectors to help handle demonstrators.  The State of Pennsylvania deployed 50 state troopers to assist the 77-member Chester police force. The demonstrations were marked by violence and police brutality.  Over six hundred people were arrested over a two-month period of civil rights rallies, marches, pickets, boycotts and sit-ins.

Gorbey was a judge of the Delaware County Court of Common Pleas from 1968 to 1970.

Gorbey was nominated by President Richard Nixon on November 30, 1970, to the United States District Court for the Eastern District of Pennsylvania, to a new seat created by 84 Stat. 294. He was confirmed by the United States Senate on December 19, 1970, and received his commission on December 21, 1970. His service was terminated on October 24, 1977, due to his death.

Gorbey is interred at the Calvary Cemetery in West Conshohocken, Pennsylvania.

See also
List of mayors of Chester, Pennsylvania

Notes

References

External links

 

1920 births
1977 deaths
20th-century American judges
20th-century American lawyers
United States Marine Corps personnel of World War II
Bowling Green State University alumni
Burials in Pennsylvania
Judges of the Pennsylvania Courts of Common Pleas
Judges of the United States District Court for the Eastern District of Pennsylvania
Mayors of Chester, Pennsylvania
Pennsylvania city council members
Pennsylvania Republicans
Temple University alumni
United States district court judges appointed by Richard Nixon
United States Marine Corps officers